The People Next Door is a 1970 American drama film directed by David Greene and starring Eli Wallach and Julie Harris. JP Miller adapted the screenplay from his 1968 CBS Playhouse teleplay.

Plot
A married couple, Arthur and Gerrie Mason struggle with the realities of their imperfect marriage as they fight to save and rehabilitate their teenage daughter, Maxie, from having been led into a life of drug addiction and ultimate committal to a mental ward.

Cast
Eli Wallach as Arthur Mason
Julie Harris as Gerrie Mason
Deborah Winters as Maxie Mason
Stephen McHattie as Artie Mason
Hal Holbrook as David Hoffman
Cloris Leachman as Tina Hoffman
Don Scardino as Sandy Hoffman
Rue McClanahan as Della
Nehemiah Persoff as Dr. Salazar
Mike Kellin as Dr. Margolin

See also
List of films featuring hallucinogens

References

External links

1970 films
1970 drama films
American drama films
1970s English-language films
Films about drugs
Films about dysfunctional families
Films based on television plays
Films set in New York (state)
Films directed by David Greene
Embassy Pictures films
1970s American films